Diego Ismael Ferreira Villa (born 4 May 1985) is an Uruguayan footballer. His last club was Racing de Montevideo.

Honours

Player
Defensor Sporting
 Uruguayan Primera División (1): 2008

External links
 
 

1985 births
Living people
Uruguayan footballers
Uruguayan expatriate footballers
Defensor Sporting players
Club Atlético Tigre footballers
Atlético de Rafaela footballers
C.D. Antofagasta footballers
Uruguayan Primera División players
Chilean Primera División players
Argentine Primera División players
Expatriate footballers in Chile
Expatriate footballers in Argentina
Association football midfielders